Williams may refer to:

People

 Williams (surname), a surname English in origin, but popular in Wales, 3rd most common in the United Kingdom

Places

Astronomy  
 Williams (lunar crater)
 Williams (Martian crater)

Australia
Williams, Western Australia
Shire of Williams

United States
 Williams Gap, a mountain pass in Nebraska
Communities:
Williams, Arizona
Williams, California, in Colusa County
Williams, Adams County, Indiana
Williams, Lawrence County, Indiana
Williams, Iowa
Williams, Minnesota
Williams, Nebraska
Williams, Oregon
Williams, South Carolina
Williams County, North Dakota
Williams County, Ohio
Williams Township, Michigan
Williams Township, Minnesota
Williams Township, Dauphin County, Pennsylvania
Williams Township, Northampton County, Pennsylvania
Williams Bay, Wisconsin
Williams Center, Ohio
Williams Creek, Indiana

Facilities:
Williams Gateway Airport, Arizona
Williams Air Force Base, former U.S. Air Force base, a predecessor to Williams Gateway Airport
Williams Tower, the third tallest skyscraper in Houston, Texas

Education:
Williams College, a liberal arts college in Williamstown, Massachusetts
Williams Middle School (Florence, South Carolina)
Williams Middle School (Moultrie, Georgia)
Williams Middle School (Sturgis, South Dakota)

Organizations and companies
Williams Grand Prix Engineering, a Formula One racing team
Williams Holdings, a former UK conglomerate
Williams Companies, an oil and gas pipeline company
Williams International, a manufacturer of jet turbines
Williams Electronics, a gaming and amusement company; now known as WMS Industries
Williams Electric Trains, a former independent model trains manufacturer, now owned by Bachmann Industries
J.H. Williams Tool Group, a manufacturer of industrial tools

Other uses
Williams (film), a 2017 film
Williams syndrome, a developmental disorder known for its distinctive "elfin" facial features
Williams pear, a green pear cultivar, used also to produce a distilled brandy of the same name
, the name of various United States Navy ships

See also
William (disambiguation)
Williamsburg (disambiguation)
Williamson (disambiguation)
Williamsport (disambiguation)
Williamston (disambiguation)
Williamstown (disambiguation)
Williamsville (disambiguation)
Justice Williams (disambiguation)